Runar Alexandersson (born 28 March 1977) is an Icelandic male artistic gymnast, representing his nation at international competitions.  He participated at the 1996, 2000 and 2004 Summer Olympics. He also competed at world championships, including the 2002 World Artistic Gymnastics Championships in Debrecen, Hungary.

References

External links
 

1977 births
Living people
Icelandic male artistic gymnasts
Gymnasts at the 1996 Summer Olympics
Gymnasts at the 2000 Summer Olympics
Gymnasts at the 2004 Summer Olympics
Olympic gymnasts of Iceland